Workingman's Dead is the fourth studio album (and fifth overall) by American rock band Grateful Dead. It was recorded in February 1970 and originally released on June 14, 1970. The album and its studio follow-up, American Beauty, were recorded back-to-back using a similar style, eschewing the psychedelic experimentation of previous albums in favor of Jerry Garcia and Robert Hunter's Americana-styled songcraft.

In 2003, the album was ranked number 262 on Rolling Stone magazine's list of the 500 greatest albums of all time, 264 in a 2012 revised list, and 409 in the 2020 list.  It was voted number 371 in Colin Larkin's All Time Top 1000 Albums.

Recording
The band again recorded at Pacific High Recording Studio in San Francisco, spending just nine days there. After the protracted sessions required for the previous two studio albums, Garcia suggested "Let's do it all in three weeks and get it the hell out of the way". Besides trying to avoid the debt that had accumulated while recording Aoxomoxoa, the band was dealing with the stress of a recent drug bust in New Orleanswhich could have resulted in jail time. Additionally, they returned from a tour to find their soon-to-be-fired manager, Lenny Hart (father of drummer Mickey Hart), refusing to show the books to anyone else in the organization. "In midst of all this adverse stuff that was happening ... [recording the album] was definitely an upper," said Garcia in an interview.

Lyricist Robert Hunter had joined the band on the road for the first time, resulting in a period of faster song development. Unlike the psychedelic, electrified music for which the band had become known, the new songs took a new direction, reviving their folk-band roots. Bassist Phil Lesh stated "The song lyrics reflected an 'old, weird' America that perhaps never was ... The almost miraculous appearance of these new songs would also generate a massive paradigm shift in our group mind: from the mind-munching frenzy of a seven-headed fire-breathing dragon to the warmth and serenity of a choir of chanting cherubim. Even the album cover reflects this new direction: The cover for Aoxomoxoa is colorful and psychedelic, and that of Workingman’s Dead is monochromatic and sepia." In recent years, a search revealed that the photograph was taken at 1199 Evans Avenue in San Francisco.

Workingman's Dead and American Beauty, the companion album that followed months later, were, according to drummer Bill Kreutzmann, both influenced by the Bakersfield sound. He explained "We tried to be like a Bakersfield bandbut one that still sounded like we were from 300 miles north of that town ... we held to our psychedelic roots. Workingman's Dead was all about discovering the song ... American Beauty became all about having the harmonies to do that".

While on tour in Boulder, Colorado, the previous year, Garcia had purchased a steel guitar and was now keen to use it on the new batch of songs. Lesh explained, "Just as with any other instrument he picked up, he made it sing. The main impetus for this development was the nature of the new songs Hunter and Jerry had been writing; many of them had a decidedly country flavor ('Dire Wolf,' 'Friend of the Devil,' 'High Time,' 'Casey Jones,' 'Ripple'), and Jerry began using the new axe on these as they were slotted into the set lists. Bobby [Weir] also began bringing in covers of his favorite country tunes and some originals in that vein, so we were starting to see a trend developing. Personally, I was thrilled that the band could make such a complete musical about-face while still maintaining the flat-out weirdness that I’d come to know and love."

Songs such as "Uncle John's Band", "High Time", and "Cumberland Blues" were brought to life with soaring harmonies and layered vocal textures that had not previously been a part of the band's sound. According to the 1992 Dead oral history, Aces Back to Back, in the summer of 1968, Stephen Stills vacationed at Mickey Hart's ranch in Novato. "Stills lived with me for three months around the time of CSN's first record," recalls Hart, "and he and David Crosby really turned Jerry and Bobby onto the voice as the holy instrument. You know, 'Hey, is this what a voice can do?' That turned us away from pure improvisation and more toward songs."

Garcia commented that much of the sound of the album comes both from his pairing with Hunter, as well as the band's friendship with Crosby, Stills and Nash: "Hearing those guys sing and how nice they sounded together, we thought, 'We can try that. Let's work on it a little'."

Release
The album title came about when Jerry Garcia commented to lyricist Robert Hunter that the album was "turning into the 'workingman's Dead' version of the band". Having both worked on all of the album's songs and gone out on the road with the band, Hunter appears as a seventh member on the front cover photograph.

Warner Bros. released "Uncle John's Band" (backed with "New Speedway Boogie") as a single to promote the album. It received limited airplay, even though it was edited to a radio-friendly three-minute length and the lyric "goddamn" removed.

Readers of Rolling Stone voted Workingman's Dead the best album of 1970, followed by Crosby, Stills, Nash and Young's Déjà Vu and Van Morrison's Moondance.

The album was remastered and expanded in 2001 as part of The Golden Road (1965–1973) 12-CD box set. This version, given separate release in 2003, includes eight bonus tracks.  A DVD-Audio version was also released in 2001, without the bonus material. In 2014 it was issued as a two-LP set, mastered at 45 rpm by Mobile Fidelity Sound Lab.

On July 10, 2020 Rhino Records released the "50th Anniversary Deluxe Edition" of Workingman's Dead. Disc one contains a newly remastered mix of the album. Disc two and three contain a previously unreleased complete concert from the Capitol Theater in Port Chester, New York, recorded on February 21, 1971.

Track listing
All songs written by Jerry Garcia and Robert Hunter, except where noted.

Bonus track details
 "Dire Wolf" recorded June 27, 1969, at Santa Rosa Veterans Memorial Hall, Santa Rosa, CA
 "Black Peter" recorded January 10, 1970, at Golden Hall Community Concourse, San Diego, CA 
 "Easy Wind" recorded January 16, 1970, at Springer's Ballroom, Gresham, OR  
 "Cumberland Blues" recorded January 17, 1970, at Oregon State University (Gymnasium), Corvallis, OR 
 "Mason's Children" recorded January 24, 1970 at Civic Auditorium, Honolulu, HI (later released with complete concert on Dave's Picks Volume 19)
 "Uncle John's Band" recorded October 4, 1970, at Winterland, San Francisco, CA (sleeve notes incorrectly list as December 23, 1970, Winterland; another track from this date is a bonus on American Beauty)

50th Anniversary Deluxe Edition – disc two

50th Anniversary Deluxe Edition – disc three

Personnel

Grateful Dead

 Jerry Garcia – lead guitar, pedal steel guitar, banjo, vocals, lead vocals on all songs except where noted
 Bob Weir – guitar, vocals, co-lead vocals on "Cumberland Blues", lead vocals on the reissue live bonus track "Dire Wolf"
 Pigpen (Ron McKernan) – keyboards, harmonica, vocals, lead vocals on "Easy Wind"
 Phil Lesh – bass, vocals
 Bill Kreutzmann – drums, percussion
 Mickey Hart – drums, percussion (absent on discs two and three of the 50th Anniversary Deluxe Edition)
 Tom Constanten – keyboards on reissue live bonus tracks "Dire Wolf", "Black Peter", "Easy Wind", "Cumberland Blues", "Mason's Children"

Additional musicians
 David Nelson – acoustic guitar on "Cumberland Blues"

Production
 Bob Matthews, Betty Cantor, Grateful Dead –  producer
 Alembic – engineer
 Ramrod –  equipment crew
 Rex Jackson –  equipment crew
 S. Heard –  equipment crew
 Jon McIntire –  big nurse
 Sam Cutler –  executive nanny
 Cosmic Gail –  lady in waiting
 David Parker –  guardians of the vault
 Bonnie Parker –  guardians of the vault
 Mouse Studios, with Toon N Tree –  cover photo, art, and design
 John Dawson –  special thanks

Reissue production credits
 James Austin – reissue production
 David Lemieux – reissue production
 Peter McQuaid –  executive producer
 Michael Wesley Johnson –  associate producer and research coordination
 Eileen Law –  archival research
 Cassidy Law –  project coordinator
 Eric Doney –  business affairs
 Nancy Mallonee –  business affairs
 Malia Doss –  business affairs
 Dennis McNally –  Grateful mentor
 Joe Gastwirt –  mastering, production consultant
 Jimmy Edwards –  production manager
 Joe Motta –  project coordination
 Gary Peterson –  discography annotation
 Shawn Amos –  liner notes coordination
 Daniel Goldmark –  editorial supervision
 Hugh Brown –  reissue art direction, design
 Greg Allen –  reissue art direction, design
 Rachel Gutek –  reissue art direction, design
 David Singer –  poster on book cover

Charts and certifications
Billboard

RIAA Certification

See also
 So Many Roads (1965–1995)—a 1999 box set that includes the outtake "Mason's Children"
 The Golden Road (1965–1973)—a 2001 box set which includes the entirety of this album and its re-release bonus tracks
 The Warner Bros. Studio Albums—a 2010 box set which includes this album

References

1970 albums
Grateful Dead albums
Music of the San Francisco Bay Area
Warner Records albums